Vojkovice is a municipality and village in Mělník District in the Central Bohemian Region of the Czech Republic. It has about 800 inhabitants.

Administrative parts
Villages of Bukol, Dědibab and Křivousy are administrative parts of Vojkovice.

Geography
It lies in a flat agricultural landscape in the Central Elbe Table. The municipality is situated on the right bank of the Vltava River, which forms the northern municipal border.

History
The first written mention of Vojkovice is in a hoax from the 12th century, according to which allegedly in 1088 King Vratislaus II donated the village to the newly established Vyšehrad Chapter. The chapter owned Vojkovice until the mid-14th century.

Sights
In Bukol is located the Church of Saint Bartholomew. It is a Romanesque church from the 13th century, baroque modified in the 18th century.

Notable people
Bohuslava Kecková (1854–1911), physician

References

External links

Villages in Mělník District